Dragoni is a comune (municipality) in the Province of Caserta in the Italian region Campania, located about  north of Naples and about  north of Caserta.

Dragoni borders the following municipalities: Alife, Alvignano, Baia e Latina, Liberi, Roccaromana.

References

Cities and towns in Campania